|}

The Prix de Psyché is a Group 3 flat horse race in France open to three-year-old thoroughbred fillies. It is run at Deauville over a distance of 2,000 metres (about 1¼ miles), and it is scheduled to take place each year in late July or early August.

The event is named after Psyche, a figure in Greek mythology, a character from a novel by Apuleius, and also the title of the play Psyché.

The race was established in 1969, and its conditions have remained unchanged since its creation. It was given Group 3 status in 1980.

Records
Leading jockey (4 wins):
 Olivier Peslier – Agathe (1994), Sangria (1996), Vue Fantastique (2017), Villa Marina (2019)
 Yves Saint-Martin – Paulista (1974), Patia (1977), La Koumia (1985), Darara (1986)
 Pat Eddery – Sovereign Dona (1980), Zinzara (1982), Ashayer (1988), Alcando (1989)

Leading trainer (5 wins):
 François Boutin – My Great Aunt (1973), Pin Ball (1975), Antrona (1976), Lys River (1978), Lorymaya (1991)

Leading owner (4 wins):
 Daniel Wildenstein – Paulista (1974), Patia (1977), Agathe (1994), Sangria (1996)

Winners since 1979

Earlier winners

 1970: Popkins
 1971: Albany
 1972: San San
 1973: My Great Aunt
 1974: Paulista
 1975: Pin Ball
 1976: Antrona
 1977: Patia
 1978: Lys River

See also
 List of French flat horse races

References

 France Galop / Racing Post:

 france-galop.com – A Brief History: Prix de Psyché.
 galopp-sieger.de – Prix de Psyché.
 horseracingintfed.com – International Federation of Horseracing Authorities – Prix de Psyché (2016).
 pedigreequery.com – Prix de Psyché – Deauville.

Flat horse races for three-year-old fillies
Deauville-La Touques Racecourse
Horse races in France
Recurring sporting events established in 1969